William Dotson Howard (born June 2, 1964) is a former American football running back who played for the Tampa Bay Buccaneers of the National Football League for two seasons, from 1988 to 1989.  He was drafted by the Bucs in the fifth round of the 1988 NFL Draft with the 113th overall pick.  He played college football at Tennessee, where during the 1986 season he led the team in rushing, led the SEC in scoring, and set the NCAA record for most consecutive rushes by the same player (16).

References

1964 births
American football running backs
Tampa Bay Buccaneers players
Tennessee Volunteers football players
Living people